Grant Stevens may refer to:
 Grant Stevens (musician) (born 1953), Australian singer, musician and composer based in Germany
 Grant Stevens (police officer) (born 1963–1964), Australian senior police officer

See also
 Steven Grant
 Stephen Grant (disambiguation)